Death Atlas is the seventh studio album by American death metal band Cattle Decapitation. It was released on November 29, 2019, via Metal Blade Records. Its release coincided with Black Friday and came more than four years after their previous studio album, 2015's The Anthropocene Extinction.

It is the band's first album to feature second guitarist Belisario Dimuzio and new bassist Olivier Pinard. At just under 55 minutes, it is also their longest album to date. The album debuted at number 116 on the US Billboard 200 and at number 56 in Germany.

Background
Death Atlas was recorded at Denver's Flatline Audio with producer Dave Otero. Album artwork was by Wes Benscoter. Vocalist Travis Ryan comments: "We have crafted what we feel is our strongest album to date", (...) "Musically and lyrically, there is a lot of grief, anger, hate, passion, and emotion poured into this one". Prior to the album release, the band co-headlined the 2019 Summer Slaughter Tour.

Critical reception

Death Atlas has received critical acclaim, gaining a score of 80 out of 100 from Album of the Year review aggregator. Loudwire named it one of the 50 best metal albums of 2019. Decibel magazine named it the 20th best album of 2019.

Track listing

Personnel

Cattle Decapitation
Travis Ryan – vocals, keyboards 
Josh Elmore – guitars
Dave McGraw – drums
Belisario Dimuzio – guitars
Olivier Pinard – bass

Additional personnel
Jon Fishman – narration 
Riccardo Conforti – keyboards 
Laure Le Prunenec – vocals 
MC Ritchie Twitch - vocals/rap 
Tony Parker – keyboards 
Ottone Pesante – horns 
Melissa Lucas-Harlow – narration

Production
Dave Otero – production, engineering, mixing
Wes Benscoter – artwork
Gautier Serre – additional engineering

Charts

References

External links

Official website

2019 albums
Albums produced by Dave Otero
Albums recorded at Flatline Audio
Albums with cover art by Wes Benscoter
Cattle Decapitation albums
Metal Blade Records albums